The 2016 Pan American Cross Country Cup and 2016 NACAC Cross Country Championships took place on March 4, 2016. in Caraballeda, Venezuela.

Medalists

Race results

Senior men's race (10 km)

Junior (U20) men's race (8 km)

Senior women's race (8 km)

Junior (U20) women's race (6 km)

Medal table (unofficial)

Note: Totals include both individual and team medals, with medals in the team competition counting as one medal.

Participation
According to an unofficial count,  athletes from 20 countries participated.

 (0)
 (0)
 (0)
 (0)
 (0)
 (0)
 (0)
 (0)
 (0)
 (0)
 (0)
 (0)
 (0)
 (0)
 (0)
 (0)
 (0)
 (0)
 (0)
 (0)
 (0)

See also
 2016 in athletics (track and field)

References

Pan American Cross Country Cup
Pan American Cross Country Cup
Pan American Cross Country Cup
Pan American Cross Country Cup
Cross country running in Venezuela